Bobby Houston may refer to:

 Bobby Houston (American football) (born 1967), American football linebacker
 Bobby Houston (footballer, died 1915), Scottish football goalkeeper
 Bobby Houston (footballer, born 1952), Scottish footballer

See also
Bob Houston (1877–1954), Scottish footballer with St Bernard's, Hearts, Tottenham